Fauna of Monaco may refer to:
 List of birds of Monaco
 List of mammals of Monaco

See also
 Outline of Monaco